Syria (SYR) competed at the 1963 Mediterranean Games in Naples, Italy. The medal tally was 4.

See also
 Syria at the 1971 Mediterranean Games

Nations at the 1963 Mediterranean Games
1963
Mediterranean Games